"It Sure Is Monday" is a song written by Dennis Linde and recorded by American country music artist Mark Chesnutt.  It was released in May 1993 as the first single from his 1993 album Almost Goodbye.  The song reached number-one on the U.S. Billboard Hot Country Singles & Tracks chart and on the Canadian RPM Country Tracks chart. It also peaked at number 19 on the U.S. Billboard Bubbling Under Hot 100 chart.

Content
The song is an uptempo, the narrator is a young man who is complaining that he has to get busy again seeing that the weekend has passed and that "it sure is Monday".

Music video
The music video was directed by John Lloyd Miller and premiered in mid-1993.

Chart performance
"It Sure Is Monday" debuted at number 65 on the U.S. Billboard Hot Country Singles & Tracks for the week of May 22, 1993.

Year-end charts

References

1993 singles
1993 songs
Mark Chesnutt songs
Songs written by Dennis Linde
MCA Records singles
Song recordings produced by Mark Wright (record producer)
Music videos directed by John Lloyd Miller